Willie Ritchie (born Gerhardt Anthony Steffen, February 13, 1891 – March 24, 1975), was the World lightweight champion from 1912 to 1914.

Gerhardt Anthony Steffen was born in San Francisco, California on February 13, 1891. He began his boxing career in 1907 under the name of "Willie Ritchie" so that his mother would not be aware of his career.

On July 16, 1908, he met future World Bantamweight Champion Jimmy Walsh at the Reliance Athletic Club in Oakland, California, and won a six-round points decision.  Ritchie was one of the most accomplished opponents Reagan would meet in his early career.

Ritchie's first title shot was with reigning lightweight champion Ad Wolgast on November 28, 1912, in San Francisco. Ritchie dominated the fight, and after Wolgast landed two blows below the belt in the sixteenth round, the referee called the fight for Ritchie.

He held the title for two years, successfully defending it four times. In 1914, he sailed to London to face the British lightweight champion, Freddie Welsh. Welsh won the 20-round match by decision.

After losing his title, Ritchie continued to fight until retiring in 1927. In 1937, he became chief inspector for the California State Athletic Commission, a position he held until 1961.

Ritchie was a 1962 inductee to The Ring magazine's Boxing Hall of Fame (disbanded in 1987), and a 2004 inductee to the International Boxing Hall of Fame. He died in Burlingame, California, in 1975.

Professional boxing record
All information in this section is derived from BoxRec, unless otherwise stated.

Official record

All newspaper decisions are officially regarded as “no decision” bouts and are not counted in the win/loss/draw column.

Unofficial record

Record with the inclusion of newspaper decisions in the win/loss/draw column.

See also
Lineal championship

References
 

1891 births
1975 deaths
World lightweight boxing champions
Boxers from California
American male boxers